Taylor County Airport may refer to:

 Taylor County Airport (Kentucky) in Campbellsville, Taylor County, Kentucky, United States (FAA: AAS)
 Taylor County Airport (Wisconsin) in Medford, Taylor County, Wisconsin, United States (FAA: MDZ)